Under the Constitution of Singapore, the judicial system of Singapore is divided into the Supreme Court which comprises the Court of Appeal and the High Court, and the subordinate courts, namely the State Courts and Family Justice Courts. 

Singapore practices the common law legal system, where the decisions of higher courts constitute binding precedent upon courts of equal or lower status within their jurisdiction, as opposed to the civil law legal system in the continental Europe.

The current criminal code was preceded by the Indian Penal Code which was adopted when Singapore was a Crown colony of the British Empire.

History 
Jury trials were abolished in 1969 and the Criminal Procedure Code was amended in 1992 to allow for trials of capital offences to be heard before a single judge. The Court of Appeal is Singapore's final court of appeal after the right of appeal to the Judicial Committee of the Privy Council in London was abolished in April 1994. The president has the power to grant pardons on the advice of the cabinet.

In 2006, the subordinate courts initiated a pilot scheme to appoint specialist judges to the Bench. Such judges came from the legal profession and academia, with the scheme's purpose being to draw expertise to the subordinate courts, giving practitioners and academics judicial experience in the process. The specialist judge scheme has not been continued.

Organisation

Supreme Court 

The Supreme Court consists of the Court of Appeal and the High Court. The Court of Appeal exercises appellate criminal and civil jurisdiction, while the High Court exercises both original and appellate criminal and civil jurisdiction. The Chief Justice, Judges of Appeal, Judicial Commissioners and High Court Judges are appointed by the President from candidates recommended by the Prime Minister. The prime minister must consult with the Chief Justice before recommending the judges.

State Courts 

The State Courts comprise the District and Magistrate Courts—both of which oversee civil and criminal matters—as well as specialised courts such as the coroner's courts and the Small Claims Tribunals. It hears an average of 350,000 cases per year.

Family Justice Courts 

The Family Justice Courts was established in 2017 to bring together the courts from the Supreme Court and State Courts that hear cases relating to youth and family issues.

Perception

Ranking
In September 2008, a Political and Economic Risk Consultancy (PERC) survey reported Hong Kong and Singapore have the best judicial systems in Asia, with Indonesia and Vietnam the worst: Hong Kong's judicial system scored 1.45 on the scale (zero representing the best performance and 10 the worst); Singapore with a grade of 1.92, followed by Japan (3.50), South Korea (4.62), Taiwan (4.93), the Philippines (6.10), Malaysia (6.47), India (6.50), Thailand (7.00), China (7.25), Vietnam (8.10) and Indonesia (8.26). In 2010, the Rule of Law Index by the World Justice Project ranked Singapore number one for access to civil justice in the high-income countries group.

Judicial independence

Singapore has a reputation for fairness and impartiality in commercial law, and is a popular jurisdiction for arbitration and trial in Southeast Asia. The Canadian case of Oakwell Engineering v. Enernorth Industries called into question this impartiality and raised the issue of whether the judgments of Singaporean courts are enforceable outside Singapore, but claims of links between the judiciary, business and the executive arm in Singapore which were alleged to suggest a real risk of judicial bias were dismissed in appeals to the Court of Appeal for Ontario and Canadian Supreme Court.

In 2004, the United States Department of State claimed that the President of Singapore and the Minister for Home Affairs have substantial de facto judicial power, leading "to a perception that the judiciary reflected the views of the ruling party in politically sensitive cases." In addition, Singapore's "judicial officials, especially the Supreme Court, have close ties to the ruling party and its leaders". It also claimed that government leaders historically have used court proceedings, in particular defamation suits, against political opponents and critics, leading to a perception that the judiciary reflected the views of the ruling party in politically sensitive cases. Notable cases include those against opposition leaders J. B. Jeyaretnam and Chee Soon Juan. In 1997, Australian Q.C. Stuart Littlemore observed the proceedings of a high-profile defamation suit filed by Prime Minister Goh Chok Tong against Jeyaretnam on behalf of the Geneva-based International Commission of Jurists (ICJ). This was followed by his ICJ report stating that the Singapore judiciary was compliant to the ruling People's Action Party (PAP), observations which the Ministry of Law denied, and the ICJ subsequently defended. Littlemore's application to represent Chee Soon Juan in 2002 for another defamation suit was rejected by the High Court for his previous remarks about the judiciary that were seen as contemptuous and disrespectful.

On the other hand, Transparency International noted in its 2006 country study report on Singapore that truth was a defence to the "accusations and insinuations of nepotism and favouritism in government appointments" against government leaders that led to the defamation suits, and "[a]s such, if a serious accusation is made, the public hearing of these suits would give the defendant a prime opportunity to put forward the facts they allege. However, none of the defendants have proved the truth of their allegations."

See also
High Court of Singapore
Lawyers in Singapore
Judicial officers of the Republic of Singapore
Supreme Court of Singapore

References

Further reading